David Alexander De Horne Rowntree (born 8 May 1964) is an English musician, politician, solicitor, composer and animator. He is the drummer for the rock band Blur and was a Labour Party councillor for Norfolk County Council from 2017 until 2021.

Early life
Rowntree was born in Colchester, Essex, to musical parents – Susan, a viola player, and John, a sound engineer at the BBC. He has an older sister named Sara. He attended the Gilberd School, Colchester during the week, and the Landermere Music School, Thorpe-le-Soken, at weekends, where he studied percussion. He played percussion with his father in the Colchester Silver Band, a brass band. After leaving school he studied for a Higher National Diploma (HND) in Computer Science at Thames Polytechnic, and started his career as a computer programmer for Colchester Borough Council.

Music career

Blur

Rowntree played in bands with Graham Coxon while they were growing up in Colchester. He also knew Coxon's father, who taught jazz classes at Landermere. In 1989, Coxon introduced Rowntree to Damon Albarn, who was forming a band around Goldsmiths, University of London. Rowntree was asked to join and left his job to move to London. With the addition of Alex James, and after two name changes, the band settled on Blur and were signed to Food Records, which was distributed through EMI. EMI later acquired Food Records and Blur were absorbed into EMI.

Beagle 2 Mars mission
In 1998 Rowntree's life-long fascination with space led him to get involved in the Beagle 2 Mars mission. The previous year the European Space Agency (ESA) had announced its first planetary mission, an orbiter named the Mars Express. The Open University's Prof Colin Pillinger proposed it should carry a lander dedicated to looking for life and conducting scientific analyses.

Rowntree and fellow band member Alex James became involved after taking a behind the scenes tour at Houston's NASA space centre. They were struck by how many of the people they met there were British and wondered why they had to go to America to do space research and work in the industry. When they got back to the UK, they came across Beagle 2 while looking for UK space projects and pledged to support it. At that time, the cost of the lander project was estimated at £25 million and did not have wide support.

Rowntree and James joined the Beagle 2 team in 1998 to help with PR. They used their platform to help promote the project. Their support attracted high-profile support from the artist Damien Hirst and industry and financial backers. And after years of lobbying, the UK Government and ESA agreed to help finance the project. The Mars Express mission, carrying Beagle 2, was launched in June 2003. It carried a signature tune written by Blur to be beamed back from Mars to announce the lander's arrival and one of Hirst's trademark spot paintings to be used for the calibration of Beagle 2's cameras. The Beagle 2 lost contact with earth but was spotted on Mars' surface ten years later by the UK Space Agency in images taken by a NASA orbiter.

Rowntree says: "In the same way that Damien Hirst got the first artwork on Mars, we got the first music on Mars."

XFM radio
In 2014 Rowntree started as a presenter for Global Radio's alternative rock radio station XFM (now Radio X) with a regular show on Sunday nights.

On his first show he played songs by John Lennon, Elbow and The Polyphonic Spree, interspersed with discussions with his studio friend, "researcher George", on "nerdy" topics like Mars.

Video
On 31 July 2018, Rowntree appeared in the video for Slaves' newly released single, "Chokehold", as a drummer auditioning for a part in the band.

Podcast
Rowntree hosts The Dave Rowntree Podcast Show on Spotify with "researcher George". The first series was six episodes long, starting with an episode of Rowntree's "go to" music for challenging times released in November 2022.

Solo career
In November 2021 Rowntree signed a deal with Cooking Vinyl for his first solo record.  "As a kid I used to spend hours spinning the dial on my radio, dreaming of escape to all the places whose exotic stations I heard,” Rowntree said in a statement. “I’ve tried to make an album like that – tuning through the spectrum, stopping at each song telling a story about a turning point in my life, then spinning the dial and moving on."

His first solo single, "London Bridge", was released on 5 July 2022.

Rowntree's first solo album was released on 20 January 2023, titled Radio Songs.

Film and animation

Animation
Rowntree is a computer animator and owned an animation company called Nanomation for eleven years. Clients included advertising agencies and The 11 O'Clock Show. He also directed two series of the South Park-esque animated show Empire Square, which made its TV debut on Channel 4 on 18 February 2005.

Non-photorealistic rendering
Rowntree has an interest in computer graphics and has contributed to three research papers on topics related to non-photorealistic rendering. The papers look at translating video to animation using novel techniques to track and visualise movement.

Film and television
Rowntree also works in film and TV soundtrack composition. He and Ian Arber composed the music and score for the 2018 Bros documentary Bros: After the Screaming Stops. He also worked on the BBC series The Capture, which premiered in 2019 and Netflix's science fiction series The One (March 2021).

Legal and political career

Law
Rowntree trained to become a solicitor when Blur took a hiatus in 2006. He worked in the criminal department of Kingsley Napley, a firm of solicitors based in Farringdon, London.

In July 2017 he was awarded an honorary doctorate in law by Greenwich University becoming Honorary Doctor of Laws (HonLLD).

Labour candidate and councillor
Rowntree has been a keen activist and supporter of the Labour Party since becoming a member in 2002 and has been chair of London's West End branch. In April 2007 he unsuccessfully contested the safe Conservative seat of Marylebone High Street on Westminster City Council. In July 2008, he fought the Labour-held seat of Church Street, a Labour stronghold since its creation in the 1960s, but a swing from Labour to the Conservatives of 14.1% meant that he was again unsuccessful, as the Conservatives gained the seat.

In February 2008, he was selected by the Cities of London and Westminster Constituency Labour Party to stand against Conservative MP Mark Field at the 2010 general election. He was defeated at that election. In 2011, Rowntree sought selection as Labour candidate for Norwich South. He lost to Clive Lewis, a journalist and former soldier, who went on to be elected as MP.

In the Norfolk County Council election on 4 May 2017, he was elected as county councillor for the University ward in Norwich. He stood down before the 2021 election. In a statement on his website he said "It has been a joy and a privilege to represent the residents in University Ward, and I've made friendships here that will last a lifetime. I hope that when this is all over, I can get back involved somehow."

Political views
Rowntree is a committed opponent of the death penalty and patron of Amicus, an organisation that provides legal representation to people on death row in the United States.

In August 2014, Rowntree was one of 200 public figures who were signatories to a letter to The Guardian opposing Scottish independence in the run-up to September's referendum on that issue.

Campaigns
Rowntree has campaigned against prosecution of internet music filesharers. He is a member of the Advisory Council of the Open Rights Group, a United Kingdom-based digital rights NGO. When asked on Blur's website how he felt about their single "Out of Time" being leaked on the internet before its release, he replied "I'd rather it gushed".

Rowntree is a founding director of the Featured Artists Coalition.
In May 2016, he organised a celebrity "Star Boot Sale" to raise funds for mobile health clinics to help Syrian refugees and host Jordanians in need. Stars manning the stalls included Hot Chip, Melanie C, KT Tunstall and Badly Drawn Boy, with Phil Daniels as auctioneer for special lots like Kylie Minogue's handbag.

Other interests
Rowntree obtained a full pilot's licence in 1995.

Rowntree has held a foundation licence for amateur radio in the UK since 2012 using the callsign M6DRQ. He upgraded his licence in 2016 to full, with the new callsign M0IEG.

Personal life
In 1994, Rowntree married Paola, a Canadian woman. They divorced in the early 2000s. In 2007, he was dating Michelle de Vries.

In the early 1990s, Rowntree was a heavy drinker. He stopped drinking alcohol in 1993 after a particularly heavy drinking session with members of the band Siouxsie and the Banshees. However, several years later, he began a cocaine habit. This led to a public incident in 2003 when, during a TV interview of Blur for MuchMusic by Canadian journalist Nardwuar the Human Serviette, Rowntree was seen mocking and physically intimidating Nardwuar throughout the interview. Rowntree has apologised several times since for his behaviour, saying that "the day after a cocaine binge I'd sometimes fly into a murderous rage, and that this was the case on that day". By 2007, he stated that he had stopped using drugs and was "active in the recovery community". He keeps a clip of the interview on his phone, to watch if he ever considers relapsing into drug use.

Rowntree is a trustee on the board of Release, a charity that campaigns for evidence-based drug policies founded on principles of public health.

References

External links 

BBC appearance discussing poverty
Rowntree discusses why he became a Labour candidate
Equipment spec

1964 births
Alumni of the University of Greenwich
Blur (band) members
British anti–death penalty activists
Britpop musicians
English rock drummers
English solicitors
Labour Party (UK) councillors
Labour Party (UK) parliamentary candidates
Labour Party (UK) people
Living people
Members of Norfolk County Council
People from Colchester
Amateur radio people